Metrolina Speedway was an auto racing track located in northeast Charlotte, North Carolina on the Metrolina Fairgrounds.

History 
The track, also known as Charlotte Fairgrounds Speedway', was 1/2 mile (.804 km) in length and had a clay surface. It was paved for a short time in the 1970s to allow the NASCAR circuit to hold races there. Many racers have raced at Metrolina Speedway, including Dale Earnhardt Sr., Brad Teague, and Harry Gant. It is one of many racetracks in the Metrolina region of North Carolina and South Carolina.

In 2009, plans were announced to reopen the track as the Metrolina Speed and Sport Center. The track was to be repaved and the plans included a Go-Kart track, outdoor RC racing track, a hotel, and roof-top skate park but the proposal failed to move forward.

The track was the subject of the first episode of Lost Speedways on Peacock hosted by Dale Earnhardt Jr.

A FedEx logistics center now sits on the site.

References

External links
 Metrolina Speedway on Google Maps
 Metrolina Speedway at Ghosts of Southern Dirt Tracks
 Photos at Ghosts of Southern Dirt Track, the track in late 2005
 Flickr photos tagged Metrolina Speedway

Motorsport venues in North Carolina
NASCAR tracks
Sports venues in Charlotte, North Carolina
1982 establishments in North Carolina
Sports venues completed in 1982
1998 disestablishments in North Carolina